Edvard Munch (12 December 1863 – 23 January 1944) was a Norwegian painter. His best known work, The Scream (1893), has become one of Western art's most iconic images.

His childhood was overshadowed by illness, bereavement and the dread of inheriting a mental condition that ran in the family. Studying at the Royal School of Art and Design in Kristiania (today's Oslo), Munch began to live a bohemian life under the influence of the nihilist Hans Jæger, who urged him to paint his own emotional and psychological state ('soul painting'). From this emerged his distinctive style.

Travel brought new influences and outlets. In Paris, he learned much from Paul Gauguin, Vincent van Gogh and Henri de Toulouse-Lautrec, especially their use of color. In Berlin, he met the Swedish dramatist August Strindberg, whom he painted, as he embarked on a major series of paintings he would later call The Frieze of Life, depicting a series of deeply-felt themes such as love, anxiety, jealousy and betrayal, steeped in atmosphere.

The Scream was conceived in Kristiania. According to Munch, he was out walking at sunset, when he 'heard the enormous, infinite scream of nature'. The painting's agonized face is widely identified with the angst of the modern person. Between 1893 and 1910, he made two painted versions and two in pastels, as well as a number of prints. One of the pastels would eventually command the fourth highest nominal price paid for a painting at auction.

As his fame and wealth grew, his emotional state remained insecure. He briefly considered marriage, but could not commit himself. A mental breakdown in 1908 forced him to give up heavy drinking, and he was cheered by his increasing acceptance by the people of Kristiania and exposure in the city's museums. His later years were spent working in peace and privacy. Although his works were banned in Nazi-occupied Europe, most of them survived World War II, securing him a legacy.

Life

Childhood 
Edvard Munch was born in a farmhouse in the village of Ådalsbruk in Løten, Norway, to Laura Catherine Bjølstad and Christian Munch, the son of a priest. Christian was a doctor and medical officer who married Laura, a woman half his age, in 1861. Edvard had an elder sister, Johanne Sophie, and three younger siblings: Peter Andreas, Laura Catherine, and Inger Marie. Laura was artistically talented and may have encouraged Edvard and Sophie. Edvard was related to the painter Jacob Munch and the historian Peter Andreas Munch.

The family moved to Christiania (renamed Kristiania in 1877, and now Oslo) in 1864 when Christian Munch was appointed medical officer at Akershus Fortress. Edvard's mother died of tuberculosis in 1868, as did Munch's favorite sister Johanne Sophie in 1877. After their mother's death, the Munch siblings were raised by their father and by their aunt Karen. Often ill for much of the winters and kept out of school, Edvard would draw to keep himself occupied. He was tutored by his school mates and his aunt. Christian Munch also instructed his son in history and literature, and entertained the children with vivid ghost-stories and the tales of the American writer Edgar Allan Poe.

As Edvard remembered it, Christian's positive behavior towards his children was overshadowed by his morbid pietism. Munch wrote, "My father was temperamentally nervous and obsessively religious—to the point of psychoneurosis. From him I inherited the seeds of madness. The angels of fear, sorrow, and death stood by my side since the day I was born." Christian reprimanded his children by telling them that their mother was looking down from heaven and grieving over their misbehavior. The oppressive religious milieu, Edvard's poor health, and the vivid ghost stories helped inspire his macabre visions and nightmares; the boy felt that death was constantly advancing on him. One of Munch's younger sisters, Laura, was diagnosed with mental illness at an early age. Of the five siblings, only Andreas married, but he died a few months after the wedding. Munch would later write, "I inherited two of mankind's most frightful enemies—the heritage of consumption and insanity."

Christian Munch's military pay was very low, and his attempts to develop a private side practice failed, keeping his family in genteel but perennial poverty. They moved frequently from one cheap flat to another. Munch's early drawings and watercolors depicted these interiors, and the individual objects, such as medicine bottles and drawing implements, plus some landscapes. By his teens, art dominated Munch's interests. At 13, Munch had his first exposure to other artists at the newly formed Art Association, where he admired the work of the Norwegian landscape school. He returned to copy the paintings, and soon he began to paint in oils.

Studies and influences

In 1879, Munch enrolled in a technical college to study engineering, where he excelled in physics, chemistry and mathematics. He learned scaled and perspective drawing, but frequent illnesses interrupted his studies. The following year, much to his father's disappointment, Munch left the college determined to become a painter. His father viewed art as an "unholy trade", and his neighbors reacted bitterly and sent him anonymous letters. In contrast to his father's rabid pietism, Munch adopted an undogmatic stance towards art. He wrote his goal in his diary: "In my art I attempt to explain life and its meaning to myself."

In 1881, Munch enrolled at the Royal School of Art and Design of Kristiania, one of whose founders was his distant relative Jacob Munch. His teachers were the sculptor Julius Middelthun and the naturalistic painter Christian Krohg. That year, Munch demonstrated his quick absorption of his figure training at the academy in his first portraits, including one of his father and his first self-portrait. In 1883, Munch took part in his first public exhibition and shared a studio with other students. His full-length portrait of Karl Jensen-Hjell, a notorious bohemian-about-town, earned a critic's dismissive response: "It is impressionism carried to the extreme. It is a travesty of art." Munch's nude paintings from this period survive only in sketches, except for Standing Nude (1887). They may have been confiscated by his father.

Impressionism inspired Munch from a young age.  During these early years, he experimented with many styles, including Naturalism and Impressionism. Some early works are reminiscent of Manet. Many of these attempts brought him unfavorable criticism from the press and garnered him constant rebukes by his father, who nonetheless provided him with small sums for living expenses. At one point, however, Munch's father, perhaps swayed by the negative opinion of Munch's cousin Edvard Diriks (an established, traditional painter), destroyed at least one painting (likely a nude) and refused to advance any more money for art supplies.

Munch also received his father's ire for his relationship with Hans Jæger, the local nihilist who lived by the code "a passion to destroy is also a creative passion" and who advocated suicide as the ultimate way to freedom. Munch came under his malevolent, anti-establishment spell. "My ideas developed under the influence of the bohemians or rather under Hans Jæger. Many people have mistakenly claimed that my ideas were formed under the influence of Strindberg and the Germans … but that is wrong. They had already been formed by then." At that time, contrary to many of the other bohemians, Munch was still respectful of women, as well as reserved and well-mannered, but he began to give in to the binge drinking and brawling of his circle. He was unsettled by the sexual revolution going on at the time and by the independent women around him. He later turned cynical concerning sexual matters, expressed not only in his behavior and his art, but in his writings as well, an example being a long poem called The City of Free Love. Still dependent on his family for many of his meals, Munch's relationship with his father remained tense over concerns about his bohemian life.

After numerous experiments, Munch concluded that the Impressionist idiom did not allow sufficient expression. He found it superficial and too akin to scientific experimentation. He felt a need to go deeper and explore situations brimming with emotional content and expressive energy. Under Jæger's commandment that Munch should "write his life", meaning that Munch should explore his own emotional and psychological state, the young artist began a period of reflection and self-examination, recording his thoughts in his "soul's diary". This deeper perspective helped move him to a new view of his art. He wrote that his painting The Sick Child (1886), based on his sister's death, was his first "soul painting", his first break from Impressionism. The painting received a negative response from critics and from his family, and caused another "violent outburst of moral indignation" from the community.

Only his friend Christian Krohg defended him:

He paints, or rather regards, things in a way that is different from that of other artists. He sees only the essential, and that, naturally, is all he paints. For this reason Munch's pictures are as a rule "not complete", as people are so delighted to discover for themselves. Oh, yes, they are complete. His complete handiwork. Art is complete once the artist has really said everything that was on his mind, and this is precisely the advantage Munch has over painters of the other generation, that he really knows how to show us what he has felt, and what has gripped him, and to this he subordinates everything else.

Munch continued to employ a variety of brushstroke techniques and color palettes throughout the 1880s and early 1890s, as he struggled to define his style. His idiom continued to veer between naturalistic, as seen in Portrait of Hans Jæger, and impressionistic, as in Rue Lafayette. His Inger On the Beach (1889), which caused another storm of confusion and controversy, hints at the simplified forms, heavy outlines, sharp contrasts, and emotional content of his mature style to come. He began to carefully calculate his compositions to create tension and emotion. While stylistically influenced by the Post-Impressionists, what evolved was a subject matter which was symbolist in content, depicting a state of mind rather than an external reality. In 1889, Munch presented his first one-man show of nearly all his works to date. The recognition it received led to a two-year state scholarship to study in Paris under French painter Léon Bonnat.

Munch seems to have been an early critic of photography as an art form, and remarked that it "will never compete with the brush and the palette, until such time as photographs can be taken in Heaven or Hell!"

Munch's younger sister Laura was the subject of his 1899 interior Melancholy: Laura. Amanda O'Neill says of the work, "In this heated claustrophobic scene Munch not only portrays Laura's tragedy, but his own dread of the madness he might have inherited."

Paris
Munch arrived in Paris during the festivities of the Exposition Universelle (1889) and roomed with two fellow Norwegian artists. His picture Morning (1884) was displayed at the Norwegian pavilion. He spent his mornings at Bonnat's busy studio (which included female models) and afternoons at the exhibition, galleries, and museums (where students were expected to make copies as a way of learning technique and observation). Munch recorded little enthusiasm for Bonnat's drawing lessons—"It tires and bores me—it's numbing"—but enjoyed the master's commentary during museum trips.

Munch was enthralled by the vast display of modern European art, including the works of three artists who would prove influential: Paul Gauguin, Vincent van Gogh, and Henri de Toulouse-Lautrec—all notable for how they used color to convey emotion. Munch was particularly inspired by Gauguin's "reaction against realism" and his credo that "art was human work and not an imitation of Nature", a belief earlier stated by Whistler. As one of his Berlin friends said later of Munch, "he need not make his way to Tahiti to see and experience the primitive in human nature. He carries his own Tahiti within him." Influenced by Gauguin, as well as the etchings of German artist Max Klinger, Munch experimented with prints as a medium to create graphic versions of his works. In 1896 he created his first woodcuts—a medium that proved ideal to Munch's symbolic imagery. Together with his contemporary Nikolai Astrup, Munch is considered an innovator of the woodcut medium in Norway.

In December 1889 his father died, leaving Munch's family destitute. He returned home and arranged a large loan from a wealthy Norwegian collector when wealthy relatives failed to help, and assumed financial responsibility for his family from then on. Christian's death depressed him and he was plagued by suicidal thoughts: "I live with the dead—my mother, my sister, my grandfather, my father…Kill yourself and then it's over. Why live?" Munch's paintings of the following year included sketchy tavern scenes and a series of bright cityscapes in which he experimented with the pointillist style of Georges Seurat.

Berlin

By 1892, Munch formulated his characteristic, and original, Synthetist aesthetic, as seen in Melancholy (1891), in which color is the symbol-laden element. Considered by the artist and journalist Christian Krohg as the first Symbolist painting by a Norwegian artist, Melancholy was exhibited in 1891 at the Autumn Exhibition in Oslo. In 1892, Adelsteen Normann, on behalf of the Union of Berlin Artists, invited Munch to exhibit at its November exhibition, the society's first one-man exhibition. However, his paintings evoked bitter controversy (dubbed "The Munch Affair"), and after one week the exhibition closed. Munch was pleased with the "great commotion", and wrote in a letter: "Never have I had such an amusing time—it's incredible that something as innocent as painting should have created such a stir."

In Berlin, Munch became involved in an international circle of writers, artists and critics, including the Swedish dramatist and leading intellectual August Strindberg, whom he painted in 1892. He also met Danish writer and painter Holger Drachmann, whom he painted in 1898. Drachmann was 17 years Munch's senior and a drinking companion at Zum schwarzen Ferkel in 1893–94. In 1894 Drachmann wrote of Munch: "He struggles hard. Good luck with your struggles, lonely Norwegian."

During his four years in Berlin, Munch sketched out most of the ideas that would comprise his major work, The Frieze of Life, first designed for book illustration but later expressed in paintings. He sold little, but made some income from charging entrance fees to view his controversial paintings. Already, Munch was showing a reluctance to part with his paintings, which he termed his "children".

His other paintings, including casino scenes, show a simplification of form and detail which marked his early mature style. Munch also began to favor a shallow pictorial space and a minimal backdrop for his frontal figures. Since poses were chosen to produce the most convincing images of states of mind and psychological conditions, as in Ashes, the figures impart a monumental, static quality. Munch's figures appear to play roles on a theatre stage (Death in the Sick-Room), whose pantomime of fixed postures signify various emotions; since each character embodies a single psychological dimension, as in The Scream, Munch's men and women began to appear more symbolic than realistic. He wrote, "No longer should interiors be painted, people reading and women knitting: there would be living people, breathing and feeling, suffering and loving."

The Scream

The Scream exists in four versions: two pastels (1893 and 1895) and two paintings (1893 and 1910). There are also several lithographs of The Scream (1895 and later).

The 1895 pastel sold at auction on 2 May 2012 for US$119,922,500, including commission. It is the most colorful of the versions and is distinctive for the downward-looking stance of one of its background figures. It is also the only version not held by a Norwegian museum.

The 1893 version was stolen from the National Gallery in Oslo in 1994 and was recovered. The 1910 painting was stolen in 2004 from the Munch Museum in Oslo, but recovered in 2006 with limited damage.

The Scream is Munch's most famous work, and one of the most recognizable paintings in all art. It has been widely interpreted as representing the universal anxiety of modern man. Painted with broad bands of garish color and highly simplified forms, and employing a high viewpoint, it reduces the agonized figure to a garbed skull in the throes of an emotional crisis.

With this painting, Munch met his stated goal of "the study of the soul, that is to say the study of my own self". Munch wrote of how the painting came to be: "I was walking down the road with two friends when the sun set; suddenly, the sky turned as red as blood. I stopped and leaned against the fence, feeling unspeakably tired. Tongues of fire and blood stretched over the bluish black fjord. My friends went on walking, while I lagged behind, shivering with fear. Then I heard the enormous, infinite scream of nature." He later described the personal anguish behind the painting, "for several years I was almost mad… You know my picture, 'The Scream?' I was stretched to the limit—nature was screaming in my blood… After that I gave up hope ever of being able to love again."

In 2003, comparing the painting with other great works, art historian Martha Tedeschi wrote:

Whistler's Mother, Wood's American Gothic, Leonardo da Vinci's Mona Lisa and Edvard Munch's The Scream have all achieved something that most paintings—regardless of their art historical importance, beauty, or monetary value—have not: they communicate a specific meaning almost immediately to almost every viewer. These few works have successfully made the transition from the elite realm of the museum visitor to the enormous venue of popular culture.

Frieze of Life—A Poem about Life, Love and Death

In December 1893, Unter den Linden in Berlin was the location of an exhibition of Munch's work, showing, among other pieces, six paintings entitled Study for a Series: Love. This began a cycle he later called the Frieze of Life—A Poem about Life, Love and Death. Frieze of Life motifs, such as The Storm and Moonlight, are steeped in atmosphere. Other motifs illuminate the nocturnal side of love, such as Rose and Amelie and Vampire. In Death in the Sickroom, the subject is the death of his sister Sophie, which he re-worked in many future variations. The dramatic focus of the painting, portraying his entire family, is dispersed in the separate and disconnected figures of sorrow. In 1894, he enlarged the spectrum of motifs by adding Anxiety, Ashes, Madonna and Women in Three Stages (from innocence to old age).

Around the start of the 20th century, Munch worked to finish the "Frieze". He painted a number of pictures, several of them in bigger format and to some extent featuring the Art Nouveau aesthetics of the time. He made a wooden frame with carved reliefs for the large painting Metabolism (1898), initially called Adam and Eve. This work reveals Munch's pre-occupation with the "fall of man" and his pessimistic philosophy of love. Motifs such as The Empty Cross and Golgotha (both ) reflect a metaphysical orientation, and also reflect Munch's pietistic upbringing. The entire Frieze was shown for the first time at the secessionist exhibition in Berlin in 1902.

"The Frieze of Life" themes recur throughout Munch's work but he especially focused on them in the mid-1890s. In sketches, paintings, pastels and prints, he tapped the depths of his feelings to examine his major motifs: the stages of life, the femme fatale, the hopelessness of love, anxiety, infidelity, jealousy, sexual humiliation, and separation in life and death. These themes are expressed in paintings such as The Sick Child (1885), Love and Pain (retitled Vampire; 1893–94), Ashes (1894), and The Bridge. The latter shows limp figures with featureless or hidden faces, over which loom the threatening shapes of heavy trees and brooding houses. Munch portrayed women either as frail, innocent sufferers (see Puberty and Love and Pain) or as the cause of great longing, jealousy and despair (see Separation, Jealousy, and Ashes).

Munch often uses shadows and rings of color around his figures to emphasize an aura of fear, menace, anxiety, or sexual intensity. These paintings have been interpreted as reflections of the artist's sexual anxieties, though it could also be argued that they represent his turbulent relationship with love itself and his general pessimism regarding human existence. Many of these sketches and paintings were done in several versions, such as Madonna, Hands and Puberty, and also transcribed as wood-block prints and lithographs. Munch hated to part with his paintings because he thought of his work as a single body of expression. So to capitalize on his production and make some income, he turned to graphic arts to reproduce many of his paintings, including those in this series. Munch admitted to the personal goals of his work but he also offered his art to a wider purpose, "My art is really a voluntary confession and an attempt to explain to myself my relationship with life—it is, therefore, actually a sort of egoism, but I am constantly hoping that through this I can help others achieve clarity."

While attracting strongly negative reactions, in the 1890s Munch began to receive some understanding of his artistic goals, as one critic wrote, "With ruthless contempt for form, clarity, elegance, wholeness, and realism, he paints with intuitive strength of talent the most subtle visions of the soul." One of his great supporters in Berlin was Walther Rathenau, later the German foreign minister, who strongly contributed to his success.

Paris, Berlin and Kristiania

In 1896, Munch moved to Paris, where he focused on graphic representations of his Frieze of Life themes. He further developed his woodcut and lithographic technique. Munch's Self-Portrait with Skeleton Arm (1895) is done with an etching needle-and-ink method also used by Paul Klee. Munch also produced multi-colored versions of The Sick Child, concerning tuberculosis, which sold well, as well as several nudes and multiple versions of Kiss (1892). In May 1896, Siegfried Bing held an exhibition of Munch's work inside Bing's Maison de l'Art Nouveau. The exhibition displayed 60 works, including The Kiss, The Scream, Madonna, The Sick Child, The Death Chamber, and The Day After. Bing's exhibition helped to introduce Munch to a French audience. Still, many of the Parisian critics still considered Munch's work "violent and brutal" even if his exhibitions received serious attention and good attendance. His financial situation improved considerably and, in 1897, Munch bought himself a summer house facing the fjords of Kristiania, a small fisherman's cabin built in the late 18th century, in the small town of Åsgårdstrand in Norway. He dubbed this home the "Happy House" and returned here almost every summer for the next 20 years. It was this place he missed when he was abroad and when he felt depressed and exhausted. "To walk in Åsgårdstrand is like walking among my paintings—I get so inspired to paint when I am here".

In 1897 Munch returned to Kristiania, where he also received grudging acceptance—one critic wrote, "A fair number of these pictures have been exhibited before. In my opinion these improve on acquaintance." In 1899, Munch began an intimate relationship with Tulla Larsen, a "liberated" upper-class woman. They traveled to Italy together and upon returning, Munch began another fertile period in his art, which included landscapes and his final painting in "The Frieze of Life" series, The Dance of Life (1899). Larsen was eager for marriage, but Munch was not. His drinking and poor health reinforced his fears, as he wrote in the third person: "Ever since he was a child he had hated marriage. His sick and nervous home had given him the feeling that he had no right to get married." Munch almost gave in to Tulla, but fled from her in 1900, also turning away from her considerable fortune, and moved to Berlin. His Girls on the Jetty, created in 18 different versions, demonstrated the theme of feminine youth without negative connotations. In 1902, he displayed his works thematically at the hall of the Berlin Secession, producing "a symphonic effect—it made a great stir—a lot of antagonism—and a lot of approval." The Berlin critics were beginning to appreciate Munch's work even though the public still found his work alien and strange.

The good press coverage gained Munch the attention of influential patrons Albert Kollman and Max Linde. He described the turn of events in his diary, "After 20 years of struggle and misery forces of good finally come to my aid in Germany—and a bright door opens up for me." However, despite this positive change, Munch's self-destructive and erratic behavior led him first to a violent quarrel with another artist, then to an accidental shooting in the presence of Tulla Larsen, who had returned for a brief reconciliation, which injured two of his fingers. Munch later sawed a self-portrait depicting him and Larsen in half as a consequence of the shooting and subsequent events. She finally left him and married a younger colleague of Munch. Munch took this as a betrayal, and he dwelled on the humiliation for some time to come, channeling some of the bitterness into new paintings. His paintings Still Life (The Murderess) and The Death of Marat I, done in 1906–07, clearly reference the shooting incident and the emotional after-effects.

In 1903–04, Munch exhibited in Paris where the coming Fauvists, famous for their boldly false colors, likely saw his works and might have found inspiration in them. When the Fauves held their own exhibit in 1906, Munch was invited and displayed his works with theirs. After studying the sculpture of Rodin, Munch may have experimented with plasticine as an aid to design, but he produced little sculpture. During this time, Munch received many commissions for portraits and prints which improved his usually precarious financial condition. In 1906, he painted the screen for an Ibsen play in the small Kammerspiele Theatre located in Berlin's Deutsches Theater, in which the Frieze of Life was hung. The theatre's director Max Reinhardt later sold it; it is now in the Berlin Nationalgalerie. After an earlier period of landscapes, in 1907 he turned his attention again to human figures and situations.

Breakdown and recovery

In the autumn of 1908, Munch's anxiety, compounded by excessive drinking and brawling, had become acute. As he later wrote, "My condition was verging on madness—it was touch and go." Subject to hallucinations and feelings of persecution, he entered the clinic of Daniel Jacobson. The therapy Munch received for the next eight months included diet and "electrification" (a treatment then fashionable for nervous conditions, not to be confused with electroconvulsive therapy). Munch's stay in hospital stabilized his personality, and after returning to Norway in 1909, his work became more colorful and less pessimistic. Further brightening his mood, the general public of Kristiania finally warmed to his work, and museums began to purchase his paintings. He was made a Knight of the Royal Order of St. Olav "for services in art". His first American exhibit was in 1912 in New York.

As part of his recovery, Dr. Jacobson advised Munch to only socialize with good friends and avoid drinking in public. Munch followed this advice and in the process produced several full-length portraits of high quality of friends and patrons—honest portrayals devoid of flattery. He also created landscapes and scenes of people at work and play, using a new optimistic style—broad, loose brushstrokes of vibrant color with frequent use of white space and rare use of black—with only occasional references to his morbid themes. With more income Munch was able to buy several properties  giving him new vistas for his art and he was finally able to provide for his family.

The outbreak of World War I found Munch with divided loyalties, as he stated, "All my friends are German but it is France I love." In the 1930s, his German patrons, many Jewish, lost their fortunes and some their lives during the rise of the Nazi movement. Munch found Norwegian printers to substitute for the Germans who had been printing his graphic work. Given his poor health history, during 1918 Munch felt himself lucky to have survived a bout of the Spanish flu, the worldwide pandemic of that year.

Later years

Munch spent most of his last two decades in solitude at his nearly self-sufficient estate in Ekely, at Skøyen, Oslo. Many of his late paintings celebrate farm life, including several in which he used his work horse "Rousseau" as a model. Without any effort, Munch attracted a steady stream of female models, whom he painted as the subjects of numerous nude paintings. He likely had sexual relationships with some of them. Munch occasionally left his home to paint murals on commission, including those done for the Freia chocolate factory.

To the end of his life, Munch continued to paint unsparing self-portraits, adding to his self-searching cycle of his life and his unflinching series of takes on his emotional and physical states. In the 1930s and 1940s, the Nazis labeled Munch's work "degenerate art" (along with that of Picasso, Klee, Matisse, Gauguin and many other modern artists) and removed his 82 works from German museums. Adolf Hitler announced in 1937, "For all we care, those pre-historic Stone Age culture barbarians and art-stutterers can return to the caves of their ancestors and there can apply their primitive international scratching."

In 1940, the Germans invaded Norway and the Nazi party took over the government. Munch was 76-years old. With nearly an entire collection of his art in the second floor of his house, Munch lived in fear of a Nazi confiscation. Seventy-one of the paintings previously taken by the Nazis had been returned to Norway through purchase by collectors (the other 11 were never recovered), including The Scream and The Sick Child, and they too were hidden from the Nazis.

Munch died in his house at Ekely near Oslo on 23 January 1944, about a month after his 80th birthday. His Nazi-orchestrated funeral suggested to Norwegians that he was a Nazi sympathizer, a kind of appropriation of the independent artist. The city of Oslo bought the Ekely estate from Munch's heirs in 1946; his house was demolished in May 1960.

Legacy

When Munch died, his remaining works were bequeathed to the city of Oslo, which built the Munch Museum at Tøyen (it opened in 1963). The museum holds a collection of approximately 1,100 paintings, 4,500 drawings, and 18,000 prints, the broadest collection of his works in the world. The Munch Museum serves as Munch's official estate; it has been active in responding to copyright infringements as well as clearing copyright for the work, such as the appearance of Munch's The Scream in a 2006 M&M's advertising campaign. The U.S. copyright representative for the Munch Museum and the Estate of Edvard Munch is the Artists Rights Society.

Munch's art was highly personalized and he did little teaching. His "private" symbolism was far more personal than that of other Symbolist painters such as Gustave Moreau and James Ensor. Munch was still highly influential, particularly with the German Expressionists, who followed his philosophy, "I do not believe in the art which is not the compulsive result of Man's urge to open his heart." Many of his paintings, including The Scream, have universal appeal in addition to their highly personal meaning.

Munch's works are now represented in numerous major museums and galleries in Norway and abroad. His cabin, "the Happy House", was given to the municipality of Åsgårdstrand in 1944; it serves as a small Munch Museum. The inventory has been maintained exactly as he left it.

One version of The Scream was stolen from the National Gallery in 1994. In 2004, another version of The Scream, along with one of Madonna, was stolen from the Munch Museum in a daring daylight robbery. These were all eventually recovered, but the paintings stolen in the 2004 robbery were extensively damaged. They have been meticulously restored and are on display again. Three Munch works were stolen from the Hotel Refsnes Gods in 2005; they were shortly recovered, although one of the works was damaged during the robbery.

In October 2006, the color woodcut Two people. The lonely (To mennesker. De ensomme) set a new record for his prints when it was sold at an auction in Oslo for 8.1 million kroner (US$1.27 million ). It also set a record for the highest price paid in auction in Norway. On 3 November 2008, the painting Vampire set a new record for his paintings when it was sold for US$38,162,000 at Sotheby's New York.

Munch's image appears on the Norwegian 1,000-kroner note, along with pictures inspired by his artwork.

In February 2012, a major Munch exhibition, Edvard Munch. The Modern Eye, opened at the Schirn Kunsthalle Frankfurt; the exhibition was opened by Mette-Marit, Crown Princess of Norway.

In May 2012, The Scream sold for US$119.9 million, and is the second most expensive artwork ever sold at an open auction. (It was surpassed in November 2013 by Three Studies of Lucian Freud, which sold for US$142.4 million).

In 2013, four of Munch's paintings were depicted in a series of stamps by the Norwegian postal service, to commemorate in 2014 the 150th anniversary of his birth.

On 14 November 2016 a version of Munch's The Girls on the Bridge sold for US$54.5 million at Sotheby's, New York, making it the second highest price achieved for one of his paintings.

In April 2019 the British Museum hosted the exhibition, Edvard Munch: Love and Angst, comprising 83 artworks and including a rare original print of The Scream.

In May 2022 the Courtauld Gallery hosted the exhibition, Edvard Munch. Masterpieces from Bergen, showcasing 18 paintings from Norwegian industrialist Rasmus Meyer’s collection.

University Aula

In 1911 the final competition for the decoration of the large walls of the University of Oslo Aula (assembly hall) was held between Munch and Emanuel Vigeland. The episode is known as the "Aula controversy". In 1914 Munch was finally commissioned to decorate the Aula and the work was completed in 1916. This major work in Norwegian monumental painting includes 11 paintings covering . The Sun, History and Alma Mater are the key works in this sequence. Munch declared: "I wanted the decorations to form a complete and independent world of ideas, and I wanted their visual expression to be both distinctively Norwegian and universally human". In 2014 it was suggested that the Aula paintings have a value of at least 500 million kroner.

Major works

 1885–1886: The Sick Child
 1892: Evening on Karl Johan
 1893: The Scream
 1894: Ashes
 1894: Woman in Three Stages
 1894–1895: Madonna
 1894–1896: Melancholy 
 1895: Puberty
 1895: Self-Portrait with Cigarette
 1895: Death in the Sickroom
 1899–1900: The Dance of Life
 1899–1900: The Dead Mother
 1903: Village in Moonlight
 1940–1942: Self-Portrait. Between the Clock and the Bed

Selected works

Nudes

Self-portraits

Landscapes

Photographs

See also
 Edvard Munch, a 1974 biographical film

Notes

References

Citations

General sources

Further reading 

  Catalogue of exhibition at the Hunterian Museum and Art Gallery, University of Glasgow and the National Gallery of Ireland, Dublin.
 
  Recounts the 1994 theft of The Scream from Norway's National Gallery in Oslo, and its eventual recovery

External links

 
 Oslo goes high on ‘Old Munch
 Munch at Olga's Gallery—large online collection of Munch's works (over 200 paintings)
 Munch at artcyclopedia
 Edvard Munch at WikiGallery.org
 Exhibition "Edvard Munch L'oeil moderne"—Centre Pompidou, Paris 2011
 Edvard Munch at Norway's National Museum of Art, Architecture and Design

 
1863 births
1944 deaths
19th-century male artists
19th-century Norwegian painters
20th-century male artists
20th-century Norwegian painters
Art Nouveau painters
Burials at the Cemetery of Our Saviour
Expressionist painters
Norwegian male painters
People from Løten
Symbolist painters